Spain competed at the 1984 Summer Olympics in Los Angeles, United States. 179 competitors, 163 men and 16 women, took part in 104 events in 23 sports.

Medalists

|  style="text-align:left; width:78%; vertical-align:top;"|

| width="22%" align="left" valign="top" |

Archery

In its third Olympic archery competition, Spain was represented by two men and two women.

Women's Individual Competition:
Montserrat Martin – 2418 points (→ 28th place)
Ascension Guerra – 2304 points (→ 38th place)

Men's Individual Competition:
Manuel Rubio – 2390 points (→ 37th place)
José Prieto – 2341 points (→ 47th place)

Athletics

Men's 400 metres 
Angel Heras  
 Heat — 46.06
 Quarterfinals — 45.88 (→ did not advance)

Antonio Sánchez   
 Heat — 46.04
 Quarterfinals — 45.79 (→ did not advance)

Men's 1,500 metres
 José Manuel Abascal
 Qualifying Heat — 3:37.68
 Semi-Finals — 3:35.70
 Final — 3:34.30 (→  Bronze Medal)

 Andrés Vera
 Qualifying Heat — 3:45.44
 Semi-Finals — 3:36.55
 Final — 3:37.02 (→ 7th place)

 José Luis González
 Qualifying Heat — 3:47.01 (→ did not advance)

Men's 5,000 metres 
 Jorge García 
 Heat — 14:12.15 (→ did not advance)

Men's 10,000 metres
 Antonio Prieto
 Qualifying Heat — 28:57.78 (→ did not advance)

Men's Marathon
 Juan Carlos Traspaderne
 Final — did not finish (→ no ranking)

 Santiago de la Parte
 Final — did not finish (→ no ranking)

Men's Long Jump
 Antonio Corgos
 Qualification — 8.02m
 Final — 7.69m (→ 10th place)

Men's 20 km Walk
 Josep Marín
 Final — 1:25:32 (→ 6th place)

Men's 50 km Walk
 Jordi Llopart
 Final — 4:03:09 (→ 7th place)

 Manuel Alcalde
 Final — 4:05:47 (→ 9th place)

Men's Hammer Throw 
 Raul Jimeno 
 Qualification — 66.38m (→ did not advance)

Men's Pole Vault
 Alberto Ruiz
 Qualifying Round — 5.45m 
 Final — 5.20m (→ 9th place)

 Alfonso Cano
 Qualifying Round — no mark (→ did not advance)

Women's 100 metres
 Teresa Rione
 First Heat — 11.55s
 Second Heat — 11.76s (→ did not advance)

Women's High Jump 
Isabel Mozún
 Qualification — 1.75m (→ did not advance, 26th place)

Basketball

Men's Team Competition
Preliminary Round (Group B)
Defeated Canada (83-82)
Defeated Uruguay (107-90)
Defeated France (97-82)
Defeated PR China (102-83)
Lost to United States (68-101)
Quarterfinals
Defeated Australia (101-93)
Semifinals
Defeated Yugoslavia (74-61)
Final
Lost to United States (65-96) →  Silver Medal

Team Roster
 Fernando Romay
 Juan San Epifanio
 Ignacio Solozábal
 José López
 José Margall
 Fernando Martín Espina
 Juan de la Cruz
 Andrés Jiménez
 José Llorente
 Fernando Arcega
 José Beirán
 Juan Corbalán

Boxing

Men's Light Flyweight (– 48 kg)
 Agapito Gómez
 First Round — Defeated Mahjoub Mjirich (MAR), on points (3:2)
 Second Round — Lost to Marcelino Bolivar (VEN), on points (1:4)

Men's Flyweight (– 51 kg)
 Julio Gómez
 First Round — Lost to Alvaro Mercado (COL), on points (1:4)

Men's Featherweight (– 57 kg)
 Raul Trapero
 First Round — Bye
 Second Round — Lost to Türgüt Aykaç (TUR) 0:5

Men's Lightweight (– 60 kg)
 José Antonio Hernando
 First Round — Bye
 Second Round — Defeated Jean-Claude Labonte (SEY), 5:0 
 Third Round — Defeated Douglas Odane (GHA), 5:0 
 Quarterfinals — Lost to Luis Ortiz (PUR), 0:5

Canoeing

Cycling

Four cyclists represented Spain in 1984.

Individual road race
 Francisco Antequera — 23rd place
 Manuel Jorge Domínguez — did not finish (→ no ranking) 
 Miguel Indurain — did not finish (→ no ranking) 
 José Salvador Sanchis — did not finish (→ no ranking)

Diving

Men's 3m Springboard
Ricardo Camacho
 Preliminary Round — 509.10 (→ did not advance, 17th place)

Equestrianism

Fencing

Two fencers, both men, represented Spain in 1984.

Men's épée
 Ángel Fernández

Men's sabre
 Antonio García

Gymnastics

Handball

Men's Team Competition
Preliminary Round (Group B)
Lost to West Germany (16:18)
Lost to Denmark (16:21)
Lost to Sweden (25:26)
Defeated United States (17:16)
Defeated South Korea (31:25)
Classification Match
7th/8th place: Lost to Switzerland (17:18) → 8th place

Team Roster
Cecilio Alonso
Juan Javier Cabanas
Juan de la Puente
Juan Pedro de Miguel
Pere García
Rafael López
Agustín Millán
Juan Francisco Muñoz
José Ignacio Novoa
Jaime Puig
Javier Reino
Lorenzo Rico
Julián Ruiz
Eugenio Serrano
Juan José Uría

Hockey

Men's Team Competition
Preliminary Round (Group A)
 Spain – West Germany 1-3
 Spain – Australia 1-3
 Spain – India 3-4
 Spain – United States 3-1
 Spain – Malaysia 3-1
Classification Matches
 5th/8th place: Spain – Netherlands 0-0 (Netherlands win after penalty strokes, 10-4)
 7th/8th place: Spain – New Zealand 0-1 (→ 8th place)

Team Roster
 José Agut
 Javier Cabot
 Juan Arbós
 Andrés Gómez
 Juan Carlos Peón
 Jaime Arbós
 Ricardo Cabot
 Juan Malgosa
 Carlos Roca
 Mariano Bordas
 Ignacio Cobos
 Jordi Oliva
 Miguel de Paz
 Ignacio Escudé
 Santiago Malgosa
 José Miguel García

Judo

Modern pentathlon

Three male modern pentathletes represented Spain in 1984.

Individual
 Jorge Quesada
 Eduardo Burguete
 Federico Galera

Team
 Jorge Quesada
 Eduardo Burguete
 Federico Galera

Rhythmic gymnastics

Rowing

There were eight competitions for men and Spain qualified four boats, but had no women competing in 1984. Although he had competed at the 1980 Summer Olympics, Manuel Vera Vázquez was still the youngest competitor of the Spanish rowing team. The coxless pair of Fernando Climent and Luis María Lasúrtegui was a surprise medallist, and as of 2016, the team's silver medal is the only Olympic rowing medal that the nation has ever won.

Sailing

Men

Open

Shooting

Men

Women

Open

Swimming

Men's 200m Freestyle
Juan Carlos Vallejo
 Heat — 1:51.97
 B-Final — 1:51.77 (→ 10th place)

Javier Miralpeix
 Heat — 1:55.25 (→ did not advance, 28th place)

Men's 400m Freestyle 
Juan Enrique Escalas
 Heat — 3:55.93 
 B-Final — 3:55.25 (→ 10th place)

Men's 1500m Freestyle 
Rafael Escalas
 Heat — 15:30.09 (→ did not advance, 11th place)

Juan Enrique Escalas
 Heat — 15:44.85 (→ did not advance, 18th place)

Men's 100m Backstroke 
Ricardo Aldabe
 Heat — 57.90
 B-Final — 58.31 (→ 13th place)

Men's 200m Backstroke 
Ricardo Aldabe
 Heat — 2:03.94 
 Final — 2:04.53 (→ 7th place)

Men's 100m Breaststroke
Enrique Romero
 Heat — 1:05.19 (→ did not advance, 18th place)

Men's 200m Breaststroke
Enrique Romero
 Heat — 2:21.25
 B-Final — 2:21.19 (→ 13th place)

Men's 100m Butterfly
David López-Zubero
 Heat — 55.66
 B-Final — 55.61 (→ 12th place)

Harri Garmendia
 Heat — 55.97 (→ did not advance, 19th place)

Men's 200m Butterfly
Harri Garmendia
 Heat — 2:02.37
 B-Final — 2:01.82 (→ 15th place)

Men's 200m Individual Medley
Harri Garmendia
 Heat — 2:08.30 (→ did not advance, 19th place)

Men's 400m Individual Medley
Rafael Escalas
 Heat — DNS (→ did not advance, no ranking)

Men's 4 × 200 m Freestyle Relay 
Juan Enrique Escalas, Rafael Escalas, Juan Carlos Vallejo, and David López-Zubero
 Heat — 7:32.21 (→ did not advance, 11th place)

Synchronized swimming

Water polo

Men's Team Competition
Preliminary Round (Group B)
 Defeated Brazil (19-12)
 Defeated Greece (12-9)
 Lost to United States (8-10)
Final Round (Group D)
 Drew with West Germany (8-8)
 Defeated Netherlands (8-4)
 Lost to Yugoslavia (8-14)
 Drew with Australia (10-10) → 4th place

Team Roster
 Leandro Ribera
 José Morillo
 Felix Férnandez
 Alberto Canal
 Manuel Estiarte
 Pedro Robert
 Rafael Aguilar
 Jorge Signes
 Antonio Aguilar
 Jorge Carmona
 Jorge Sans
 Jorge Neira
 Mariano Moya

Weightlifting

Wrestling

References

External links
 Spanish Olympic Committee

Nations at the 1984 Summer Olympics
1984
Olympics